Scaphidriotis is a genus of moths in the subfamily Arctiinae.

Species
Scaphidriotis camptopleura (Turner, 1940)
Scaphidriotis xylogramma Turner, 1899

References

Natural History Museum Lepidoptera generic names catalog

Lithosiini
Moth genera